Qareh Kanlu may refer to:
 Qareh Kanlu, East Azerbaijan
 Qareh Kanlu, North Khorasan